Ba (Egyptian) – Soul of the deceased, depicted as a bird or a human-headed bird
 Baba Yaga (Slavic) – Forest spirit and hag
 Baccoo (Guyanese/Surinamese) – Malevolent little people
 Badalisc (Italian) – Goat-like creature from the southern central Alps
 Bagiennik (Slavic) – Malevolent water spirit
 Bahamut (Arabian) – Giant fish
 Bai Ze (Chinese) – Talking beast which handed down knowledge on harmful spirits
 Ba Jiao Gui (Chinese) – Banana tree spirit
Bak (Indian) – Assamese shape-shifting aqueous creature
 Bake-kujira (Japanese) – Ghostly whale skeleton that drifts along the coastline of Shimane Prefecture
 Bakeneko (Japanese) – Magical cat
 Bakezōri (Japanese) – Animated straw sandal
 Bakhtak (Iranian) – Night demon named Shaina
 Baku (Japanese) – Dream-devouring, tapir-like creature
 Bakunawa (Philippine) – Sea serpent that causes eclipses
 Balaur (Romanian) – Multi-headed dragon
 Baloz (Albanian) – Sea monster
 Bannik (Slavic) – Bathhouse spirit
 Banshee (Irish) – Screaming death spirit
 Baobhan Sith (Celtic Mythology) – Beautiful vampiric seductresses who prey on young travelers
 Barbegazi (Swiss) – Dwarf with giant, snowshoe-like feet
 Bardha (Albanian) – Mountain spirit
 Bardi (Trabzon) – Shapechanging death spirit
 Barghest – Yorkshire black dog
 Bar Juchne (Jewish) – Gigantic bird
 Barnacle Geese (Medieval folklore) – Geese which hatch from barnacles
 Barong (Balinese) – Tutelary spirit
 Basajaun (Basque) – Ancestral, megalith-building race
 Baš Čelik (Serbian) – Powerful, evil winged man whose soul is not held by his body and can be subdued only by causing him to suffer dehydration
 Bashe (Chinese) – Elephant-swallowing serpent
 Basilisco Chilote (Chilota) – Chicken-serpent hybrid
 Basilisk (Italian) – Multi-limbed, venomous lizard
 Basty (Turkic) -  Evil spirit or goblin of bad dreams
 Bathala (Philippine) – Primordial god of creation
 Batibat (Philippine) – Female night-demon
 Batsu (Chinese) – Drought spirit
 Baubas (Lithuanian) – Malevolent spirit
 Baykok (Ojibwa) – Flying skeleton
 Beast of Bray Road (American Folklore) – Werewolf
 Bean Nighe (Irish) – Death spirit; a type of Banshee/Bean Sídhe)
 Behemoth (Jewish) – Massive beast, possibly like a dinosaur or crocodile
 Bendigeidfran (Welsh) – Giant king
 Bennu (Egyptian) – Heron-like, regenerative bird, equivalent to (or inspiration for) the Phoenix
 Berehynia (Slavic) – Water spirit
 Bergrisar (Norse) – Mountain giants who live alongside the Hrimthursar (lit. "Rime-Giants") in Jotunheim
 Bergsrå (Norse) – Mountain spirit
 Bestial beast (Brazilian) – Centauroid specter
 Betobeto-san (Japanese) – Invisible spirit which follows people at night, making the sound of footsteps
 Bhūta (Buddhist and Hindu) – Ghost of someone killed by execution or suicide
 Bi-blouk (Khoikhoi) – Female, cannibalistic, partially invisible monster
 Bies (Slavic) – Demon
 Bigfoot (American Folklore) – Forest-dwelling hominid cryptid.
 Binbōgami (Japanese) – Spirit of poverty 
 Bishop-fish (Medieval Bestiaries) – Fish-like humanoid
 Biwa-bokuboku (Japanese) – Animated biwa
 Black Annis (English) – Blue-faced hag
 Black Dog (British) – Canine death spirit
 Black Shuck – Norfolk, Essex, and Suffolk black dog
 Blafard – Imaginary creature from the early United States of America
 Blemmyae (Medieval Bestiary) – Headless humanoid with face in torso
 Bloody Bones (Irish) – Water bogeyman
Błudnik (Slavic) – Mischievous gnome
 Blue Crow (Brazilian) – Giant amazonian bird
 Bluecap (English) – Mine-dwelling fairy
 Bodach (Scottish) – Malevolent spirit
 Bogeyman (English) – Malevolent spirit
 Boggart (English) – Malevolent household spirit
 Boginki (Slavic) – Nature spirit
 Bogle (Scottish) – Malevolent spirit
 Boi-tatá (Brazilian) – Giant snake
 Bolla (Albanian) – Dragon
 Bonnacon (Medieval Bestiaries) – Bull-horse hybrid with flaming dung
 Boo Hag (American Folklore) – Vampire-like creature that steals energy from sleeping victims
 Boobrie (Scottish) – Roaring water bird
 Bozaloshtsh (Slavic) – Death spirit
 Brag (English) – Malevolent water horse
 Brownie (English and Scottish) – Benevolent household spirit
 Broxa (Jewish) – Nocturnal bird that drains goats of their milk
 Bucca (Cornish) – Male sea-spirit, a merman, that inhabited mines and coastal communities as a hobgoblin during storms
 Bokkenrijders (Dutch) – Ghosts/devils riding flying goats; co-opted by bandits to instil fear during raids
 Bugbear (English) – Bearlike goblin
 Buggane (Manx) – Ogre-like humanoid
 Bugul Noz (Celtic) – Extremely ugly, but kind, forest spirit
 Bukavac (Serbia) – Six-legged lake monster
 Bunyip (Australian Aboriginal) – Horse-walrus hybrid lake monster
 Bunny Man (American Folklore) West Virginia Urban Legend – Spirit/Maniac that wears a bunny costume and wields an ax
 Bush Dai Dai (Guyanese) – Spirit that seduces and kills men
 Byangoma (Bengali) – Fortune-telling birds
 Bysen (Scandinavian) – Diminutive forest spirit

B